Echinoderes cernunnos is a species of mud dragons first found in coastal and subtidal locations around the Korean Peninsula and in the East China Sea.

References

Further reading
 Sørensen, Martin V., et al. "Occurrence of the newly described kinorhynch genus Meristoderes (Cyclorhagida: Echinoderidae) in Korea, with the description of four new species." Helgoland Marine Research 67.2 (2013): 291-319.
 Sørensen, Martin V. "First account of echinoderid kinorhynchs from Brazil, with the description of three new species." Marine Biodiversity 44.3 (2014): 251-274.

External links

Kinorhyncha
Animals described in 2012